Maarsseveen is a former hamlet in the Dutch province of Utrecht. It was located on the east bank of the Vecht River, opposite the village of Maarssen, and has now been completely absorbed by that town. It makes part of the municipality of Stichtse Vecht.

From 1815 to 1949, Maarsseveen was a separate municipality. Apart from the village itself, the municipality covered the polder Maarsseveen, and the village of Oud-Maarsseveen.

Populated places in Utrecht (province)
Former municipalities of Utrecht (province)
Stichtse Vecht